Er Lannic is a small island in the 
commune of Arzon, in the Morbihan department in Brittany in northwestern France.  Er Lannic is a bird reserve and also the site of two stone circles, the southern of which is submerged.

See also
Gulf of Morbihan
Gavrinis

References

External links 

 Stones of France - Er Lannic Stone Circle

Islands of Brittany
Archaeological sites in Brittany
Landforms of Morbihan
Stone circles in Europe